Fritz Kirchhoff (1901–1953) was a German screenwriter, film producer and director. He was a noted director during the Nazi era, directing film such as the anti-British propaganda thriller Attack on Baku (1942). His 1942 film 5 June, showing the German defeat of France in 1940, was banned by Joseph Goebbels for unclear reasons, although it has been speculated it was to avoid offending the Vichy government. After the Second World War Kirchhoff set up his own production company in Hamburg.

Selected filmography

Director
 Tango Notturno (1937)
 My Friend Barbara (1937)
 When Women Keep Silent (1937)
 Shadows Over St. Pauli (1938)
 Why Are You Lying, Elisabeth? (1939)
 Three Wonderful Days (1939)
 The Eternal Spring (1940)
 Attack on Baku (1942)
 5 June (1942)
 When the Young Wine Blossoms (1943)
 A Wife for Three Days (1944)
 One Day (1945)
 Only One Night (1950)

Producer
 The Girl from the South Seas (1950)
 Maya of the Seven Veils (1951)
 The Thief of Baghdad (1952)
 I Lost My Heart in Heidelberg (1952)
 The Colourful Dream (1952)

References

Bibliography

External links

1901 births
1953 deaths
Film people from Hanover
German male writers
Male screenwriters
20th-century screenwriters